José Maria Berzosa (15 August 1928 – 2 January 2018) was a Spanish television director who lived the most part of his life auto–exiled in France.

His documentaries are characterized by having the humor of Luis Buñuel and the erudition of Jorge Luis Borges. His work details objectivity ideas in favor of staging (even when he films «the real» and claims creative subjectivity).

One of his most important productions was «Chile Impresiones» (1976), a documentary for French television whose purpose was to discredit the international image of Augusto Pinochet dictatorship, the de facto administration that denied violation of human rights in the name of order and depoliticization. The novelty of said filming consists in having denounced the situation under a methodology that mixed mockery with intimate daily life, that is, through (that the three generals, except for Gustavo Leigh partially, did not know how to answer) made by Berzosa based on ontological themes like philosophy and aesthetics about happiness, ethics or art. Chilean Military Junta generals would only discovered Berzosa's attack once the documentary was published.

Biography
Born in Albacete, he was a film critic during his youth in Spain. However, in 1956, he decided to leave the Iberian country for political reasons that involved clash of francoism censorship towards his potential professional development.

He died on 2 January 2018 aged 89.

Works
 1959: Les Cinq Dernières Minutes de Claude Loursais.
 1967: Le Musée de Sèvres
 1967: Le Musée de la police
 1967: La realidad supera a la ficción
 1967: Miguel Ángel Asturias, un maya a la cour du roi Gustave
 1968: Alberto Giacometti
 1968: Luis Buñuel tourne La Voie lactée
 1969: Festival Théâtral de Nancy
 1969: Dubuffet
 1969: Giacometti
 1969: L'architecture paysanne en Iran
 1969: Jorge Luis Borges : Le passé qui ne menace pas
 1969: Jorge Luis Borges : Les journées et les nuits
 1970: Matisse
 1970: Le malentendu du design
 1970: Daumier
 1970: Brouillon d’un reportage autour Pablo Ruiz Picasso, artiste-peintre
 1970: Julio González
 1971: Colette/Sido
 1971: Fernand Léger
 1971: Le christianisme au Portugal
 1971: Francis Bacon : l’ultime regard
 1972: La musique de l’exil, les Russes
 1972: Rouge, Greco, rouge
 1972: Charles Fourier
 1973: L’amour et la charité
 1973: Zurbarán, la vie des moines et l’amour des choses
 1973: Espagnes
 1974: Retour au Portugal I : Lourdes Castro de Madere
 1974: Retour au Portugal II : Les intellectuels
 1975: ¡Arriba España!
 1976: Chili Impressions : Les pompiers de Santiago / Voyage au bout de la droite / Au bonheur des généraux / Monsieur le Président
 1977: Les candidates de Saint-Amour
 1978: Des choses vues et entendues ou rêvées en Bretagne à partir desquelles Dieu nous garde de généraliser
 1979: Import Export
 1979: Coupez les cheveux de quatre mouches entre midi et quatorze heures
 1979: Joseph et Marie : les mots et les gestes
 1980: Quatre adresses pour Viollet-le-Duc
 1981: Eduardo Chillida
 1981: Tomi Ungerer
 1982: Haïti : Entre Dieu et le président / Les lois de l'hospitalité / Les enfants de Millbrook
 1983: Antonio Saura, quelques rêveries d’un promeneur solitaire
 1983: La leçon de cinéma de François Truffaut
 1983: Entre-Temps
 1985: De la sainteté I-II-II-IV
 1987: Ceux qui se souviennent
 1989: Juan Carlos Onetti
 1990: Iconoclasme
 1992: Montaigne aimé autour de nous
 1993: Où es-tu ? (Le diable en Galicie)
 1995: L'éducation, la souffrance, le plaisir
 1995: Le Château de Liechtenstein et le Paternoster de Prague
 1996: Franco, un fiancé de la mort
 1996: Rafael Alberti
 2001: Pinochet et ses trois généraux

References

External links
 IMDb Profile

1928 births
2018 deaths
Spanish television directors
French people of Spanish descent
Spanish film directors
People from Albacete